This is a list of reported active squadrons and detachments of the Russian Air Force in 2007.

Index of abbreviations
IIVE - Research Instructor Helicopter Squadron (Issledovatelskiy Instruktorskiy Vertoliotniy Eskadrilya)
LO - Aviation Detachment (Lyotnyi Otriad)
LO VTA - Aviation Detachment of Military Transport Aviation (Lyotnyi Otriad Voyenno-Transportnoy Aviatsii )
ODRAO - Independent Long-range Reconnaissance Aviation Detachment (Otdelnyi Dalniy Razvedyvatelnyi Aviatsionnyi Otriad)
OSAE - Independent Composite Aviation Squadron (Otdelnaya Smeshannaya Aviatsionnaya Eskadrilya)
OTAE PSS - Independent Transport Aviation Squadron (Otdelnaya Transportnaya Aviatsionnaya Eskadrilya Poiskovo-Spasatelnoy Sluzhby)
OVE - Independent Helicopter Squadron (Otdelnaya Vertoliotnaya Eskadrilya)
OVE REB - Independent Helicopter Squadron of Electronic Warfare(Otdelnaya Vertoliotnaya Eskadrilya Radio-Elektronnoy Bor'by)
OVTAE - Independent Military Transport Aviation Squadron (Otdelnaya Voyenno-Transportnaya Aviatsionnaya Eskadrilya)
VTAD - Military Transport Aviation Division (Voyenno-Transportnaya Aviatsionnaya Diviziya)

Sources
Piotr Butowski. Force report:Russian Air Force, Air Forces Monthly, July & August 2007 issues.

Units and formations of the Russian Air Force
Russian
Air